Evax pygmaea is a plant species in the family Asteraceae.

Sources

References 

Gnaphalieae
Flora of Malta